The Keystone XOK was an American biplane observation floatplane developed for the United States Navy during the early 1930s.

Design and development
In 1929, the Navy issued requirements calling for an observation floatplane intended for service aboard Omaha class light cruisers, readily convertible to wheels or floats and light enough to operate from the cruiser-type catapult.

Prototypes were ordered from Keystone-Loening (then a subsidiary of Curtiss-Wright),  Berliner-Joyce and Vought, and designated as the XOK-1,  XOJ-1 and XO4U-1 respectively.
The Keystone design was a conventional biplane of mixed metal and fabric construction, with the pilot and observer seated in tandem in open cockpits. It made its first flight on January 5, 1931.

On April 15, 1931, during a demonstration before naval officials, the XOK-1 broke up in flight after the cowling detached itself and smashed into the wings and tailplane.  With the Berliner-Joyce and Vought prototypes nearly ready for trials, the Bureau of Aeronautics elected to discontinue further development of the XOK-1. Eventually, the Berliner-Joyce's entry was selected for production.

Operators

United States Navy

Specifications (XOK-1)

See also

References

Citations

External links
 Keystone XOK-1 photograph.

Keystone aircraft
Single-engined tractor aircraft
Floatplanes
1930s United States military reconnaissance aircraft
Biplanes
Aircraft first flown in 1931